The women's 100 metre butterfly competition at the 2014 Pan Pacific Swimming Championships took place on August 23 at the Gold Coast Aquatic Centre.  The last champion was Dana Vollmer of US.

This race consisted of two lengths of the pool, all in butterfly.

Records
Prior to this competition, the existing world and Pan Pacific records were as follows:

Results
All times are in minutes and seconds.

Heats
The first round was held on August 23, at 10:12.

B Final 
The B final was held on August 23, at 19:38.

A Final 
The A final was held on August 24, at 20:24.

References

2014 Pan Pacific Swimming Championships
2014 in women's swimming